Hubert Duifhuis (Original Dutch: Hubert(us) or Huibert Duyfhuys or Duifhuis, Rotterdam, October 27, 1531 - Utrecht, April 3, 1581) was a Dutch Reformed pastor. He carried out a reformation in the Jacobikerk in 1578, but did not establish a consistory or use a catechism, and he admitted to communion anyone who presented himself (open communion). Werner Helmichius (Werner(us) Helmichius (Utrecht, 1550 - Amsterdam, August 29, 1608, Dutch reformed pastor) opposed open communion, and the church in Utrecht became divided between the Reformed of the Consistory (who opposed open communion) and the Preachers of the Old and New Testament (who promoted it).

References
2. Israel, Jonathan (1995). The Dutch Republic: It's Rise, Greatness, and Fall, 1477-1806, Oxford Press,  pp. 227, 238, 370-371, 424.

1531 births
1581 deaths
16th-century Dutch Calvinist and Reformed ministers
Clergy from Rotterdam